Hamza Namira is an Egyptian singer-songwriter and multi-instrumentalist. He has released three albums from the production of Awakening Records: Dream With Me, Insan, Esmaani; and a couple of albums from Namira production, his own foundation: Hateer Min Tany and Mawlood Sanat 80. Besides singing, for which he is mostly known, he has also worked in musical composition and arrangement. Hamza composed some of his own work, like the album heads Esmaani and Insan, along with some collaborations with other artists, like Maher Zain's song Ya Nabi Salam Alayka. He also contributed to arranging the cartoony remake Egyptian Jingle Bells (also known as Oh la la song), which was the first shaabi work in his repertoire, later followed by Esta3izo in his fourth studio album.

Hamza's work is mostly marked by a recurring sociopolitical theme, diverting from love songs and focusing on topics of general humanist interest, like hope, alienation, generational change, and oppression. He's also interested in reviving cultural heritage. Having been dubbed "Voice of the Revolution", works of Hamza rose to prominence during the 25 January revolution, in which he personally participated, and were considered a symbolic figure thereof. Dari Ya Alby, from his third album, topped the SoundCloud chart for almost a month.

Career

Beginnings
Namira started to develop an interest in music when he was 17 years old, when he set about learning the guitar, keyboard, and ‘oud. He also vested interests in several musical styles: Middle Eastern, Egyptian traditional and folk music, light rock, jazz, and Latin music. From 1999 until 2004, Namira played in a band headed by the Alexandrian artist Nabil Bakly. Although a relatively unknown musician, Namira later said that Bakly was his main musical influence. He then went on to form his own group. Namira composed his first songs and managed to get a few like-minded friends together to establish the band "Nomaira". In the meantime, he studied commerce at the Alexandria University and graduated in 2003.

In light of Namira's debut album, which had a main fan base of college students, one commentator described him as the "new Sayed Darwish", a cover of whose song, Shedd El Hizam, was released in the album.

Breakthrough success
Namira's second album, Insan [Human] was released in July 2011. This coincided with the Arab spring, which he declared was a main factor in his popularity. According to him, he wants to express the real issues of his generation that mainstream works don't cover due to concerns of musical market needs and pressure from production companies.

When British Prime Minister David Cameron visited Egypt on 21 February 2011 (only ten days after President Hosni Mubarak left office), Namira was one of a select group of people invited to meet with him and to participate in a one-hour discussion about the future of Egypt.

Namira's fixation on sociopolitical issues continued along the timeline of the Egyptian part of the Arab Spring. In January 2014, he released a single, Wa Ollak Eh, in which he emphasized on rejecting violence, hatred, and the general polarized environment following the 2013 Egyptian coup d'état and Rabia massacre.

Remix series
In 2016, Namira launched his own weekly TV series Remix on the pan-Arab TV channel Al Araby. , 3 seasons of the show were released, with a total number of 34 episodes. Along the series, Namira blended different music genres with local lyrics, including flamenco, electro, celtic, and others. Arabic lyrics were adopted from the Maghreb, the levant, Egypt, and Saudi Arabia, while non-Arab included Amazigh, Kurdish, and Armenian.

With a running time of around 20-30 minutes, each episode would examine the historical origin and evolution of a work of folklore or pop culture in an Arab region, or sometimes in even other neighboring regions, like Armenia and Kurdistan. In exploration of the musical piece, Namira would interview original artists (if still alive), their family members, local enthusiasts, or cultural officials. For example, he met with Hamdi Benani for an Algerian cover, and with the grandparent of Sayed Darwish for a remake of his Yā Wild ʿammy. At the end of each episode, Hamza would publicly perform a remix of the work, usually outside its place of origin or popularity. A number of songs were performed in London, which is both the headquarter of Al Araby and Hamza's place of residence. Works of Remix were mostly collaborative, featuring Lowkey, Babylone, Isam Bachiri, Hamid Al Shaeri, among others.

Discography

Albums

Studio albums

Remix

Extended plays

Singles

Videography

Political views
Hamza has openly opposed the occupation of Palestine and the official position in Egypt towards the Arab–Israeli conflict. He was also a vocal proponent of the Arab spring, naming El Midan after Tahrir Square, due to its role in the Egyptian revolution, and dedicating his Hila Hila Ya Matar for the Jasmine Revolution in Tunisia. Namira also dedicated his Hekayet Tefl for the children of Syrian refugees.

In November 2014, Namira's songs were banned from Egyptian state radio for "criticising the authorities". In response to questions about the ban and his legal status in Egypt, Hamza declared that he only expresses his opinions as per rights included in the Egyptian constitution, and that he doesn't identify as an activist, nor a politician.

In an interview with Youm7, Namira emphasized that he doesn't affiliate with the Muslim Brotherhood organization. He expressed his support for the Egyptian Military in the Sinai insurgency and expressed condolences for Ahmed Mansi, an Egyptian colonel killed during a terrorist attack.

He finally returned to settle and resume concerts in Egypt in September 2022 after spending years in exile.

Philanthropy
Namira joined a two-day UK tour organized by Human Appeal International to fundraise for medical equipment and provide training for more than 10,000 medical practitioners in Egypt. He performed in Vienna, Austria in October 2014 in an event organized by Humanic Relief.

In 2019, Namira released Hekayet Tefl in collaboration with United Muslim Relief as part of a fundraiser to support children of refugees of the Syrian Civil War in Jordan. The campaign raised around £E90,000.

References

External links

Hamza Namira on Twitter

1980 births
Living people
21st-century Egyptian male singers
Egyptian male actors
People from Alexandria
Awakening Music artists
Alexandria University alumni
Singers who perform in Egyptian Arabic